The Angry Pacifist was a magazine produced by Daws Hill and Naphill peace camps. It produced two editions, both in 1984. The funds needed to produce the magazine were raised through a peace walk, starting at Daws Hill and ending at Naphill.

External links
Angry Pacifist Number 1
Angry Pacifist Number 2

1984 establishments in the United Kingdom
1984 disestablishments in the United Kingdom
Defunct political magazines published in the United Kingdom
Magazines established in 1984
Magazines disestablished in 1984
Pacifism in the United Kingdom
Peace camps